Eisenach – Wartburgkreis – Unstrut-Hainich-Kreis is an electoral constituency (German: Wahlkreis) represented in the Bundestag. It elects one member via first-past-the-post voting. Under the current constituency numbering system, it is designated as constituency 190. It is located in western Thuringia, comprising the city of Eisenach and the districts of Wartburgkreis and Unstrut-Hainich-Kreis.

Eisenach – Wartburgkreis – Unstrut-Hainich-Kreis was created for the inaugural 1990 federal election after German reunification. Since 2021, it has been represented by Klaus Stöber of the Alternative for Germany (AfD).

Geography
Eisenach – Wartburgkreis – Unstrut-Hainich-Kreis is located in western Thuringia. As of the 2021 federal election, it comprises the independent city of Eisenach and the districts of Wartburgkreis and Unstrut-Hainich-Kreis.

History
Eisenach – Wartburgkreis – Unstrut-Hainich-Kreis was created after German reunification in 1990, then known as Eisenach – Mühlhausen. In the 2002 election, it was named Eisenach – Wartburgkreis – Unstrut-Hainich-Kreis I. In the 2005 through 2013 elections, it was named Eisenach – Wartburgkreis – Unstrut-Hainich-Kreis II. It acquired its current name in the 2017 election. In the 1990 through 1998 elections, it was constituency 297 in the numbering system. In the 2002 and 2005 elections, it was number 191. Since the 2009 election, it has been number 190.

Originally, the constituency comprised the districts of Eisenach and Mühlhausen. In the 2002 election, it comprised the city of Eisenach, the district of Wartburgkreis, and the municipalities of Bad Langensalza, Heyerode, and Katharinenberg and the Verwaltungsgemeinschaften of Unstrut-Hainich and Vogtei from the Unstrut-Hainich-Kreis district. In the 2005 through 2013 elections, it gained of the municipalities of Menteroda and Weinbergen and the Verwaltungsgemeinschaften of Bad Tennstedt, Herbsleben, and Schlotheim from the Unstrut-Hainich-Kreis district. It acquired its current borders in the 2017 election.

Members
The constituency was first represented by Manfred Heise of the Christian Democratic Union (CDU) from 1990 to 1998. Eckhard Ohl won it for the Social Democratic Party (SPD) in 1998 and served a single term. He was succeeded by fellow SPD member Ernst Kranz from 2002 to 2009. Christian Hirte was elected in 2009, and re-elected in 2013 and 2017. He was defeated in 2021 by Klaus Stöber of the Alternative for Germany (AfD).

Election results

2021 election

2017 election

2013 election

2009 election

References

Federal electoral districts in Thuringia
1990 establishments in Germany
Constituencies established in 1990
Eisenach
Wartburgkreis
Unstrut-Hainich-Kreis